Hypergastromyzon is a genus of loaches endemic to the island of Borneo in Southeast Asia.

Species
There are currently 3 recognized species in this genus, described by ichthyologist Heok Hui Tan:
 Hypergastromyzon eubranchus T. R. Roberts, 1991
 Hypergastromyzon humilis T. R. Roberts, 1989

References

Gastromyzontidae
Fish of Asia